Monkeygate may refer to:
 Monkeygate, a controversy involving the Indian cricket team in Australia in 2007–08
 Monkeygate, a Volkswagen emissions scandal